Willard Warren Scott Jr. (February 18, 1926 – January 1, 2009) was a lieutenant general in the United States Army.  He graduated from the United States Military Academy at West Point in 1948.  He was commissioned upon his graduation from West Point and assigned to the artillery.  He later went on to serve as superintendent of the United States Military Academy from 1981 through 1986.

Biography

Early life
Born February 18, 1926, at Fort Monroe, Virginia.  Willard Scott was the son of an Army Coastal Artillery officer Willard Warren Scott Sr. and Bernice Peck Scott [both buried at the Military Cemetery at The Presidio in San Francisco]. General Scott spent the early part of his life in San Francisco and, in fact, crossed the Golden Gate Bridge on the day it opened in 1937, leading a contingent of student crossing guards. He had 2 brothers Richard and Peter Scott. Before graduating from the military academy he met Justine Dorney of New Rochelle, New York. They were married in June 1948 and had 7 children. General Scott continued to be an ardent supporter of Army football and had the honor of having one of the mascot Army mules (General Scott or Scotty) named in his honor by a vote of the Association of Graduates.

Military career
General Scott received, throughout his military career, the Distinguished Service Medal, two Legions of Merit, two Bronze Stars, the Air Medal, the Joint Service Commendation Medal, and two Commendation Medals. Lt. Scott's first command was as Battery Commander, 5th Field Artillery Battalion, 1st Division in Europe, 1949–52 (commanding the Dog battery first commanded by Alexander Hamilton in the battle of Long Island in 1776). During the Vietnam War Colonel Scott was the deputy commander of the 2nd Field Force V Artillery, and Commander 23rd Artillery Group. Upon promotion to brigadier general he took over as Commanding General, MAC V Special Troops, 1970–72, Commanding General, 25th Infantry Division, 1976–78, and Commanding General, V Corps in Germany, 1980–81.

In 1981, Scott was selected to be the 52nd Superintendent of the U.S. Military Academy. He served as Superintendent until his retirement from the Army in 1986. After the army General Scott served as the executive director of the Association of Military Colleges from 1988 through 1997.

General Scott was an honorary member of the Society of the Cincinnati.

Always active in the Catholic Church, Scott served as an extraordinary minister of Holy Communion, lector, and religious education teacher through his career and retirement. While at West point, both as a cadet and superintendent, he attended mass daily.

Coincidentally, Willard W. Scott was a cadet at West Point at the same time as Winfield W. Scott, with Willard being two years senior to Winfield.  While they share W. W. Scott as their abbreviated name, the two are not related. But both attained the rank of lieutenant general and both became service academy superintendents, with Willard being the superintendent at West Point through several of the same years that Winfield was superintendent at the United States Air Force Academy.

Only one of General Scott's 26 grandchildren has followed him into the U.S. Army. His grandson, Scott Aladar Rosenshein, son of Lawrence and Katie (née Scott) Rosenshein, is a member of the Class of 2009 of the United States Military Academy. Like his grandfather he was a member of the Army Lacrosse team and wore the #48 in honor of his grandfather (who was Class of 1948).  In addition, two of General Scott's daughters, Mary and Susan, married West Pointers, Steven Starner and David Shanahan, respectively. Another daughter, Margaret, is an expert on Indonesia after having made several trips there a number of years ago.

Scott died on January 1, 2009, at his home in Alexandria, Virginia, from a form of Parkinson's disease.

Decorations
   Army Distinguished Service Medal
   Legion of Merit with oak leaf cluster
   Bronze Star with oak leaf cluster
   Air Medal
   Joint Service Commendation Medal
   Army Commendation Medal with oak leaf cluster

References

1926 births
2009 deaths
United States Army personnel of the Vietnam War
People from Hampton, Virginia
Recipients of the Distinguished Service Medal (US Army)
Recipients of the Legion of Merit
United States Army generals
United States Military Academy alumni
Superintendents of the United States Military Academy
Recipients of the Air Medal
Burials at West Point Cemetery
20th-century American academics